I Love the Way They Scream When They Die is a live album by Brutal Juice.  It was recorded at two shows in Austin, Texas in early 1994.

The album was self-released (attributed to "Homus Boyus Productions") later that year in the United States, where it was distributed by Alternative Tentacles.  In Europe, Alternative Tentacles released the album on the label as Virus 157.

Track listing
"Lashings of the Ultra-Violent" – 2:55
"Cannibal Holocaust" – 5:09
"Humus Tahini" – 4:47
"Hardcore and Wine" – 2:14
"Galaxy" – 4:17
"Doorman" – 4:52
"Numbskull" – 2:55
"Whorehouse of Screams" – 6:36
"Cathy Rigby" – 5:12
"Nation Wide" – 5:17
"The Vaginals" – 2:18
"Kentucky Fuck Daddy" – 3:49
"Waxing Gibbous" – 4:54
"Black Moment of Panic" – 4:25
"Punk Fuck" – 3:23
"Pull the Plug" – 6:52

Personnel
Craig Welch - lead vocals
Gordon Gibson - lead vocals, guitar
Ted Wood - guitar, vocals
Ben Burt - drums
Sam McCall - bass, vocals
Joey Gibson - additional vocals (on "Cathy Rigby")

References
BRUTAL JUICE
https://alternativetentacles.com/about/

Brutal Juice albums
1994 debut albums
1994 live albums
Alternative Tentacles live albums